Mercury Sergeyevich Ghilarov (also written as Merkurii Giliarov, 22 February 1912 – 6 March 1985) was a Soviet soil scientist who was a pioneer of soil biology, the life in the soil including insects and other small invertebrates. Ghilarov laid emphasis on the soil as a peculiar medium that consisted of a mix of liquid, solid, and gas phases and therefore suggested that it was the zone of evolutionary transition between aquatic and terrestrial life forms.

Ghilarov (also spelt Giliarov in English) was born in Kiev and studied entomology at the State University of Kiev from 1929 to 1933 after which he worked for the Ukrainian Plant Protection Station. He later moved to Moscow to work on rubber-bearing plants and then began to study soil insects. He obtained a Ph.D. in 1938 and in 1944 he moved to the Institute of Evolutionary Morphology where he proposed the idea of soil as a transitional environment between aquatic and terrestrial life. He wrote an influential monograph on “The specificity of soil as insect habitat and its role in insect evolution” (1949) and in 1956 he founded the first laboratory for soil zoology. He began to examine soil faunal compositions and established their use in a system to classify soils in the USSR. Ghilarov may have been the first researcher to systematically observe a relationship between organism biomass and abundance, and though this work in soils made little impact, a similar phenomenon in oceans would become widely known. 

Ghilarov received the USSR State Prizes in 1951, 67 and 80 apart from the Mechnikov Gold Medal from the Academy of Sciences of the Soviet Union (1978). He was also a recipient of the Filippo Silvestri Gold Medal (1965), the Gustav Kraatz Medal (1966) and other honours.

References

1912 births
1985 deaths
Full Members of the USSR Academy of Sciences
Taras Shevchenko National University of Kyiv alumni
Stalin Prize winners
Recipients of the Order of Lenin
Recipients of the Order of the Red Banner of Labour
Recipients of the USSR State Prize
Soviet soil scientists
Soviet entomologists
Burials at Novodevichy Cemetery